Silmido (Silmi Island) is an uninhabited island in the Yellow Sea, off the west coast of South Korea. It has an area of about 0.25 km2. It lies within the borders of Incheon metropolitan city, and is about 5 kilometres southwest of Incheon International Airport. Silmido lies just offshore of the larger, inhabited island of Muuido, which is connected to the mainland by ferry. Most of the island consists of hills that are around 80 m high.

Silmido became historically significant when it was used as the training ground (January 21, 1968 to August 23, 1971) for Unit 684, a South Korean military detachment created to assassinate North Korean leader Kim Il-sung in response to the Blue House raid assassination attempt against President Park Chung-hee. Traces of the training facilities can still be seen. Under circumstances which remain unclear, the members of the group mutinied and went to Seoul in 1971, where they were killed or committed suicide.

Background

On January 21, 1968, a group of 31 North Korean military soldiers were sent to South Korea by Kim Il-sung to kill President Park Chung-hee. A firefight began when the commandos were just 800 yards from the Blue House (the South Korean Presidential Palace). In all, 68 South Koreans were killed and 66 were wounded, including about two dozen civilians. Three Americans also died defending South Korea's president, and three were wounded.

Unit 684

In response to the attempted assassination of Park Chung-hee, South Korea began training Unit 684, to infiltrate North Korea and kill Kim Il-sung.

The assassination mission was subsequently cancelled. On 23 August 1971, the members of Unit 684 revolted, killing most of their guards and making their way to the mainland, where they hijacked a bus to Seoul. The bus was stopped by the Army in Daebang-dong, Yeongdeungpo-gu, Seoul and 20 members of the Unit on board were shot or committed suicide with hand grenades. The four survivors were sentenced to death by a military tribunal and executed on 10 March 1972.

Film

Silmido is well-known today as the principal setting of the 2003 film of the same name, which is based on the true story of Unit 684. Thanks to the film's success, the island has become a fairly popular tourist destination.

See also

 Islands of South Korea
 Geography of South Korea
 Tourism in South Korea
 List of islands
 Desert island

References

Uninhabited islands of South Korea
Islands of Incheon
Islands of the Yellow Sea